was a Japanese politician who served as Prime Minister of Japan in 1948. He was a prominent figure in the immediate postwar political landscape, but was forced to resign his leadership responsibilities after a corruption scandal (Shōwa Denkō Jiken) targeting two of his cabinet ministers.

Early life 

Ashida was born in Fukuchiyama, Kyoto, the second son of politician and banker Shikanosuke Ashida. His father had been in the House of Representatives and served as director of Nōkō Bank. His grandfather was landed magnate and village headman (nanushi) Jizaemon Ashida.

He studied French civil law at Tokyo Imperial University. After graduation, he worked in the Ministry of Foreign Affairs for twenty years.

Early career 
In 1932, Ashida ran his first successful campaign for a seat in the House of Representatives as a member of the Seiyūkai Party. He sided with Ichirō Hatoyama's "orthodox" wing following the Seiyukai's split in 1939.

After the war, Ashida won a seat in the new Diet as a member of the Liberal Party, from which he split to merge with Kijūrō Shidehara's Progressive Party to form the Democratic Party. Ashida was elected president of the new party, and became minister of foreign affairs in 1947 under Socialist prime minister Tetsu Katayama.

He also chaired the Committee on the Bill for Revision of the Imperial Constitution, and served as the chairman of the Kenpō Fukyū Kai, a society created to promote the revised Constitution of Japan, from 1946–1948. During his term, he made a key amendment to Article Nine of the planned Japanese Constitution, which enabled the creation of the Japanese Self-Defense Force.

Prime minister and later life

Ashida became prime minister in 1948, leading a coalition government of Democratic and Socialist members. His tenure ended just seven months after it began. Two of his cabinet ministers were accused of corruption in the Showa Electric scandal, which forced the cabinet to resign. One of them was Takeo Kurusu, a state minister without a portfolio.

After his tenure as prime minister, Ashida focused on Japan's position in Asia and re-armament. He became outspoken in support of creating a national defense force after the outbreak of the Korean War, fearing that a similar conflict may occur in Japan. Ashida also promoted the idea of forming a Japanese group of volunteers to fight alongside United Nations Command in support of the Republic of Korea. In 1951, he gave speaking tours across Japan advocating for his interpretation of Article 9, stating that it does not impose restrictions on Japan preparing a force for defensive purposes. 

In 1958, Ashida was cleared of all charges in relation to corruption allegations. He died a year later at the age of seventy-one.

References

External links

|-

1887 births
1959 deaths
20th-century prime ministers of Japan
Deputy Prime Ministers of Japan
Foreign ministers of Japan
Liberal Party (Japan, 1945) politicians
Democratic Party (Japan, 1947) politicians
National Democratic Party (Japan) politicians
Kaishintō politicians
Democratic Party (Japan, 1954) politicians
Liberal Democratic Party (Japan) politicians
People acquitted of corruption
Politicians from Kyoto Prefecture
Prime Ministers of Japan
Rikken Seiyūkai politicians
20th-century Japanese politicians